Henry Scudamore-Stanhope may refer to:

 Henry Scudamore-Stanhope, 9th Earl of Chesterfield (1821–1887), English nobleman
 Henry Scudamore-Stanhope, 11th Earl of Chesterfield (1855–1935), English nobleman

See also
 Henry Scudamore, 3rd Duke of Beaufort
 Henry Stanhope (disambiguation)